Gordon Livie (10 June 1932 – 2004) was an English professional footballer who played in the Football League for Mansfield Town.

References

1932 births
2004 deaths
English footballers
Association football defenders
English Football League players
Leicester City F.C. players
Mansfield Town F.C. players
Bourne Town F.C. players